Sonduru Wasanthe (The Lovely Spring) is a 2006 Sri Lankan Sinhala romantic drama film directed by Roy de Silva and produced by Ajanee Rita Perera for Ajanee Films. It stars newcomer Tharindu Wijesinghe, with Chathurika Peiris and Anarkali Akarsha in lead roles along with Arjuna Kamalanath, and Anusha Damayanthi. Music composed by Sangeeth Wickramasinghe. It is the 1075th Sri Lankan film in the Sinhala cinema.

Plot

Cast
 Tharindu Wijesinghe as Malinga
 Chathurika Peiris as Harshi
 Anarkali Akarsha as Anju
 Niroshan Wijesinghe as Roshan
 Arjuna Kamalanath as Mahinda
 Anusha Damayanthi as Renuka
 Nilanthi Dias as Nisha
 Mahinda Pathirage as Amadoru
 Himali Siriwardena as Kamala
 Roy de Silva as Jayawardena
 Teddy Vidyalankara as Thug
 Lahiru Mudalige as Mahesh

References

2006 films
2000s Sinhala-language films
Films set in Sri Lanka (1948–present)